Kirill Mikhailovich Gashichev (born 20 March 1980) is a Russian football manager and a former player.

Playing career
As a player, he only played one season on the professional level in 2003 in the Russian Second Division with FC Pikalyovo.

References

External links
 

1980 births
Footballers from Saint Petersburg
Living people
Russian footballers
FC Petrotrest players
Russian football managers
Association football goalkeepers
FC Tosno players
FC Lokomotiv Saint Petersburg players
FC Sever Murmansk players